
Gmina Kamień Krajeński is an urban-rural gmina (administrative district) in Sępólno County, Kuyavian-Pomeranian Voivodeship, in north-central Poland.

The gmina contains part of the protected area called Krajna Landscape Park.

Villages
Apart from the town of Kamień Krajeński, Gmina Kamień Krajeński contains the villages and settlements of Dąbrowa, Dąbrówka, Duża Cerkwica, Jakubowo, Jerzmionki, Mała Cerkwica, Niwy, Nowa Wieś, Obkas, Obkas-Młyn, Orzełek, Osady Zamerckie, Płocicz, Radzim, Witkowo and Zamarte.

Neighbouring gminas
Gmina Kamień Krajeński is bordered by the gminas of Chojnice, Człuchów, Debrzno, Kęsowo and Sępólno Krajeńskie.

References
Polish official population figures 2006

Kamien Krajenski
Sępólno County